Paul Pearson may refer to:
 Paul G. Pearson (1926–2000), president of Miami University
 Paul Martin Pearson (1871–1938), governor of the United States Virgin Islands
 Paul Pearson (Canadian football) (born 1957), Canadian football slotback